"Don't You Worry 'bout a Thing" is a song by American singer-songwriter Stevie Wonder, released as the third single from his sixteenth studio album, Innervisions (1973). It reached number 16 on the US Billboard Pop Singles chart, number 10 on the Cash Box Top 100, and number two on the R&B chart. The song's lyrics convey a positive message, focusing on taking things in one's stride and accentuating the positive. In 1992, British band Incognito had a European hit with their cover of the song.

Music and lyrics
The tune is in E minor, starting with a Latin piano intro. The opening melody is reminiscent of Horace Silver's "Song for My Father", over which Stevie engages in an English-speaking dialogue with a woman, trying to impress her with talk of worldliness of having been to "Iraq, Iran, Eurasia" before changing to Spanish, using the phrase "Todo 'stá bien chévere", which loosely translates as "Everything's really great," continuing with an attempt to impress the woman.

Reception
Describing the song for the "Stevie Wonder: 20 Essential Songs" feature in The Daily Telegraph, Chris Harvey said:
With its playful Latin-piano-and-street-jive intro ...  and its uplifting, upward-spiralling chorus, Don't You Worry 'bout a Thing easily takes its place among the works of pure joy that the musical prodigy has effortlessly poured out throughout his career. Showcased on the 1973 Innervisions album that came from the period in which Wonder ... was experimenting with synthesized sounds with producer Robert Margouleff, it's a back-to-basics song (although it does feature a Moog bass, played by Wonder) that relies on the interplay of piano, percussion and that ecstatic voice. It sounds and feels like a burst of summer happiness. 

Billboard said that the song is a "strong ballad with gentle arrangements".  Cash Box called it an "interesting Latin flavored disk," going on to say that "the vocals are soft and perfectly accented by some fine piano by Stevie and great backing percussion." Record World said that "quasi-Spanish banter introduces a Latin-lilting [song]" in which "he feeling [Wonder] produced on 'You Are The Sunshine of My Life' goes uptempo and uptown."

Charts

Weekly charts

Year-end charts

Incognito version

In 1992, British acid jazz band Incognito covered "Don't You Worry 'bout a Thing" on their third album, Tribes, Vibes and Scribes (1992). It features vocals by American jazz singer Maysa Leak and was a hit in Europe. The single was successful especially in the Netherlands, where it peaked at number six. Additionally, it was a top 20 hit in the United Kingdom, a top 30 hit in Belgium and a top 40 hit in Sweden. A music video was produced to promote the single. It features the band performing the song in a blue Triumph Herald 13/60 Convertible, while driving in the streets of London. Other scenes show them in a multistorey car park. A re-issue of the single was released in 2005.

Critical reception
Paula Edelstein from AllMusic described the song as a "killer cover". Another editor, David Jeffries, called it an "effervescent cover". Andy Beevers from Music Week viewed it as "Latin-tinged commercial jazz funk". Sam Wood from The Philadelphia Inquirer deemed it a "killer version" that "springs off this disc with flourishes of bright, brassy Miami Horns, a suncopated house-styled piano figure, and Maysa Leak's stunning voice." James Hamilton from the RM Dance Update, stated that Stevie Wonder's "brassily strutting 1974 US hit is here wailed by new girl Maysa".

Track listing
 12" single, UK (1992)
"Don't You Worry 'bout a Thing" (LP Version) – 5:17
"Colibri" (Remix) – 5:39
"Don't You Worry 'bout a Thing" (Frankie Foncett Mix) – 6:38
"Don't You Worry 'bout a Thing" (Frankie Foncett Underground Instrumental Mix) – 5:35                  

 CD single, Europe (1992)
"Don't You Worry 'bout a Thing" (Edit) – 4:09
"Don't You Worry 'bout a Thing" (LP Version) – 5:18
"Colibri" (Remix) – 5:40
"Don't You Worry 'bout a Thing" (Frankie Foncett Mix) – 6:40

Charts

References

1973 songs
1974 singles
1992 singles
Stevie Wonder songs
Songs written by Stevie Wonder
Tamla Records singles
Talkin' Loud singles
Song recordings produced by Stevie Wonder